Pyotr Petrovich Vereshchagin (Russian: Пётр Петрович Верещагин; 14 January 1834/36 in Perm – 16 January 1886 in Perm) was a Russian landscape and cityscape painter in the Academic style. He was the first to paint plein-air in the wilderness of the Urals.

Biography 
His father, Pyotr Prokopovich (1795–1843) and grandfather, Prokopy Danilovich (1764-c.1811) were painters. His brothers, Vasily and Mitrofan (1842–1894) became painters as well. He was not related to the well-known military painter, Vasily Vasilyevich Vereshchagin.

His father was his first teacher. Later he studied with his maternal grandfather, a local icon painter named Ivan Babin. From 1858 to 1865, he was enrolled at the Imperial Academy of Arts, where his most influential instructor was Sokrat Vorobiev, a landscape painter who had spent many years in Italy.

His first exhibition came at the Academy in 1860 and he later received several silver medals. During these years, he also exhibited paintings of cityscapes, ranging from Moscow to Tallinn. He graduated as an "Artist, 3rd Degree" and worked as a teacher in Ludza; then part of the Vilna Governorate. In 1870, he gave up teaching and travelled for a year, painting. After that, he returned to Saint Petersburg. In 1873, he was named an "Academician".

He later exhibited internationally, as well as in Russia, participating in the Centennial Exposition in Philadelphia and the Exposition Universelle (1878) in Paris. In 1875 and 1876 he also worked for the Ural Railway Network, sketching scenes along the Chusovaya River, in preparation for extending the railway there. During the Russo-Turkish War, he painted with Russian troops in the Balkans and, on his return, created a panorama of the bombardment of the fortress at Ruse.

Selected paintings

References

Literature

External links 

 ArtNet: More paintings by P.P. Vereshchagin

1830s births
1886 deaths
Russian painters
Russian male painters
Landscape painters
Cityscape artists
People from Perm, Russia
19th-century painters from the Russian Empire
19th-century male artists from the Russian Empire